Miri is a city in northern Sarawak, Malaysia, on the island of Borneo.

Miri or MIRI may also refer to:

Geography

Sarawak
 Miri (federal constituency), in Sarawak, Malaysia, represented in the Dewan Rakyat
 Miri (state constituency), defunct constituency formerly represented in the Sarawak State Legislative Assembly (1969–91)
 Miri District, an administrative district in Miri Division, Sarawak, Malaysia 
 Miri Division, Sarawak, Malaysia

Others
 Miri, India, a village, List of villages in Pathardi taluka, in Pathardi taluka, Ahmednagar district, Maharashtra State, India
 Miri-ye Khani-ye Do, a village in Kerman Province, Iran. 
 Miray, also spelled Miri, Afghanistan
 Miri, Indonesia, a subdistrict in Sragen Regency, Central Java

People

Surname
 Angela Miri (born 1959), Nigerian academic and poet
 Maziar Miri, Iranian filmmaker
 Mrinal Miri, Indian philosopher and educationalist
Seyed Javad Miri, Iranian sociologist

Given name

 Miri Aloni, Israeli folk-singer. 
 Miri Ben-Ari, classically trained violinist known primarily for her work on several hip-hop projects
 Miri Bohadana, Israeli actress, model and presenter. 
 Miri Eisin, Colonel of the Israeli Army with a background in political science
 Miri Fabian, Israeli actress
 Miri Gold, American-Israeli rabbi
 Miri Mesika, Israeli singer and actress
 Miri Regev, Israel Defense Forces' spokesperson
 Miri Rubin, medievalist at Queen Mary, University of London

Peoples
 Mising people (Plains Miri)
 Mishing language
 Hill Miri people

Crime syndicate

 Miri-Clan, German crime syndicate run by a Lebanese clan

Technology
 Machine Intelligence Research Institute
 MIRI (Mid-Infrared Instrument), part of the James Webb Space Telescope

Other
 "Miri" (Star Trek: The Original Series), a first season episode of Star Trek: The Original Series
Miri language (disambiguation)
Miri piri in Sikhism